"Reste Encore" (French for: Keep Staying) is a song by French recording band L5. Initially written by Christina Rumbley, Peter Ibsen, and Sacha Skarbek with English lyrics, it was adapted by Noun and produced by Fred Fraikin and Djoum for the group's second studio album Retiens-Moi (2002). The sensual piano ballad was released as the album's fourth and final single in November 2003 and reached number 56 on the French Singles Chart, becoming the band's lowest-charting single. In 2007, fellow Popstars winners No Angels recorded the original song, entitled "Make a Change", for their fourth studio album Destiny (2007).

Charts

Release history

References

External links
 JessGlynne.co.uk — official site

2002 songs
2003 singles
2007 songs
No Angels songs
Mercury Records singles
Songs written by Sacha Skarbek